Jambville is a commune in the Yvelines department in the Île-de-France region in north-central France. It is 50 kilometres to the north west of Paris in the heart of the Vexin national park. Château de Jambville is the Centre national de formation des Scouts et Guides de France (National Training Centre for Scouts and Guides of France). The chateau dates from the 16th to the 19th Century.

See also
Communes of the Yvelines department

References

External links
Jambville on Scoutopedia

Communes of Yvelines